KRXP (103.9 FM, "X103.9") is a radio station licensed to Pueblo West, Colorado. Owned by Bahakel Communications, it broadcasts an alternative rock format.

History
The station was known as KYZX 103.9 The Eagle with a classic rock format until October 31, 2008, when it adopted the 103-9 RXP moniker and changed the calls letters to KRXP and began a year-long transition from classic rock to alternative rock. On April 29, 2021, the station rebranded as X103-9 with no change in format.

References

External links

Bahakel Communications
RXP
Pueblo County, Colorado
Radio stations established in 2008
Alternative rock radio stations in the United States